Oughtershaw is a hamlet in the Yorkshire Dales, North Yorkshire, England. It lies on a road it shares with other small villages; Deepdale, Yockenthwaite and Hubberholme, which traverses the watershed between Upper Wharfedale\Langstrothdale and Wensleydale over Fleet Moss into Gayle. The name is first recorded in 1241 as Huctredsdale, and stems from Uhtred's copse, a personal name. It has had many spellings down the years, being known variously as Ughtershaw, Ughtirshey, Owghtershawe, and Outershaw in the 19th century.

Contrary to popular belief the river running past Oughtershaw is not the Wharfe; it is Oughtershaw Beck, which runs down to Beckermonds and then merges with Greenfield Beck to source the River Wharfe at the Langstrothdale chase.

Oughtershaw is one of the hamlets on the Dales Way a long-distance walk that starts in the West Yorkshire town of Ilkley and travels  to Windermere, in Cumbria.

References

External links

Villages in North Yorkshire
Wharfedale